Dorymyrmex incomptus is a species of ant in the genus Dorymyrmex. Described by Snelling in 1975, the species is endemic to Chile.

References

Dorymyrmex
Hymenoptera of South America
Insects described in 1975
Endemic fauna of Chile